Denver and Rio Grande Western 223 is a  "Consolidation" type narrow-gauge steam railway locomotive built for the Denver and Rio Grande Railroad by the Grant Locomotive Works of Paterson, New Jersey in 1881-82. Number 223 was completed in December 1881, at a cost of $11,553. Baldwin built an additional 25 locomotives in the same class at the same time.

Operational history
Although the Utah State Historical Society suggests that the 223 worked in Utah (the Utah operations of what became the D&RGW were narrow gauge until 1890), and the 223's National Register of Historic Places nomination included this, the Rio Grande Modeling and Historical Society's roster of locomotives does not show it in the Utah section. It was later concluded by Jerry Day that the 223 was never used in Utah.

On December 11, 1892, the Denver & Rio Grande's Salida shops and roundhouse caught fire. The fire started in the waste box in the cab of D&RG No.419 and spread to the oil-soaked floor. Due to the city's fireplugs being shut off because of cold weather, the shop burned to the ground, taking the 223 with it. The 223 was rebuilt soon after and placed back in service.

Only 13 years later, the 223 was involved in another roundhouse fire, this time in Gunnison on January 17, 1905. The 223 again burned along with sister C-16 No. 218. Both locomotives were rebuilt, and the 223's tender tank was replaced in April of the same year.

The Rio Grande Southern Railway was known to lease locomotives from the D&RG. In 1907 the 223 and other C-16s were sent to the RGS, being returned to the D&RG in 1922. On September 12 of that year the 223 collided with C-16 no. 222 in Chama, New Mexico. No records of the damage to either locomotive were kept.

The final location of the 223's operation comes from eight photographs taken by Otto Perry on July 4, 1940, showing 223 working the 18 mile Baldwin Branch, with photographs at Gunnison, Dollard, Castleton, and Baldwin. The Baldwin Branch was originally built by the Denver, South Park & Pacific (Colorado Southern) and retained its original wooden bridges. Due to the weight restrictions of these bridges, the remaining C-16s were the only locomotives permitted on the branch, and the 223 served on this portion of the D&RGW from 1937 to her retirement.

Most of the C-16s were retired by the late 1920s-mid-1930s; only one stayed in service until the mid-1950s (#268 was retired in 1955). The 223 was removed from service in 1941.

On to Utah
The railroad leased 223 to Salt Lake City, beginning at the 1941 Pioneer Day celebration, for five years, and donated it to the city in 1952. The locomotive was given a fake diamond stack and an 1880s paint scheme in the Salida, Colorado, shops, before being sent to Salt Lake City. A popular myth, caused by the mis-captioning of photographs, is that the 223 was moved on a special train led by four brand-new FT locomotives. According to Jerry Day, noted Rio Grande historian, it was actually sister locomotive 268 that was shipped on this special train, not the 223. In 1952, upon the donation to the city, the Rio Grande's Salt Lake City shops removed the diamond stack and box headlight and repainted the 223 in its 1930s "button herald" paint scheme on their own time.

Shipped along with the 223 were a narrow gauge boxcar, caboose, and high-side gondola, which were sent to Pioneer Village in the Lagoon Amusement Park in Farmington, Utah. These cars were later stored in Ogden in poor condition alongside the 223 until they were burned in the 2006 Shupe-Williams Candy Factory Fire.

The 223 sat in the open at Liberty Park, gradually deteriorating from weather and vandalism until 1979, when the city gave it to the Utah State Historical Society. John Bush, employee of the Roaring Camp & Big Trees Railroad in California, was commissioned to make a report on the cost of potential restoration. Lack of budget limited success with the project and it was again transferred, to the Utah State Railroad Museum in 1992. The 223 was stored behind the Shupe-Williams Candy Factory building just to the south of the Union Station, until the candy factory caught fire in 2006 and burned to the ground, taking with it three narrow gauge freight cars. Luckily the cab had already been removed from the engine before the fire. The 223 was then moved from there to its present location at the north end of the Utah State Railroad Museum complex next to the restoration shop. Limited restoration has been underway at its current location, Union Station, Ogden, Utah, with the tender and cab in the Museum's shop and the remainder sitting outside without boiler lagging.

It has been long believed that during the 1979 move from Liberty Park to the Utah State Historical Society property, the frame and rods were bent badly so that the wheels will no longer turn, even with the rods disconnected. However, through analysis of historical photographs, it has been determined that the rods were in actuality bent during its display at Liberty Park to prevent it from rolling. The track on which the 223 was displayed sloped noticeably to the west, with no wheel stops or other end-of-track protection. A flat spot can be felt under the main rod 1 on the Fireman's side of the engine where the jack was placed to bend it. The boiler is in very poor condition, having sat outside for fifty years with wet asbestos around it. The tender is being entirely replaced.

Restoration
Until 2020, restoration work was being done by the Golden Spike Chapter of the Railway & Locomotive Historical Society in the former Trainman's Building at the North end of the Ogden Union Station.

Restoration began in 1992 using a boxcar, UP 910261, as a shop. The group soon outgrew this rudimentary shelter and was given the Trainman's Building after the Candy Factory Fire in 2006. Ogden City paid for roof repairs, an alarm system and fluorescent lighting, and the restoration work was moved inside. At the same time the 223 was moved from its place behind the Shupe-Williams Candy Factory to the north end of the platform outside of the shop.

Currently, the wooden cab is completed, the appliances are repaired, and work on the tender is nearing completion. As of 2010, the tender tank was being riveted, with over 3,000 hand-drilled rivet holes. The Golden Spike Chapter works according to the "pay-as-you-go" philosophy, completing work as they obtain the funds, which accounts for the slow, yet steady, progress of the restoration.

It was added to the National Register of Historic Places as Grant Steam Locomotive No. 223 in 1979.

In 2019 the R&LHS crew was locked out of the shop by Ogden City and refused to allow continued work on the locomotive at Union Station. In October 2020, restoration of the 223 was halted. The State of Utah has expressed interest in moving the locomotive to a static display in Salt Lake City. Tools and equipment from the R&LHS that were used on the 223 have been donated to the C&T for use there.

130th anniversary celebration
2011 marked the 130th anniversary of the 223's construction (1881–2011). In addition, it is the 70th year since the 223's removal from service (1941) and the 20th year since she was moved to Ogden from Salt Lake City. To commemorate the event, the Golden Spike Chapter began uploading to YouTube videos from important events in the 223's recent history, such as the 1991 move from Salt Lake City and the 2006 Candy Factory Fire. The 130th anniversary was also featured in the December 2010, issue of the Colorado Time-Table.

See also

Rio Grande 168
Rio Grande 169
Rio Grande 278
Rio Grande 315
Rio Grande 463

References

External links
 D&RGW 223 official website
 Golden Spike Chapter, R&LHS Video channel
 The 223's 130th Anniversary in the Colorado Time-Table
 The 223 in the Standard-Examiner

Railway vehicles on the National Register of Historic Places in Utah
Transportation in Weber County, Utah
Railway locomotives introduced in 1881
Railway locomotives on the National Register of Historic Places
2-8-0 locomotives
Individual locomotives of the United States
0223
Narrow gauge steam locomotives of the United States
National Register of Historic Places in Weber County, Utah
3 ft gauge locomotives
Preserved steam locomotives of Utah